Girls of the Golden West may refer to:
Girls of the Golden West (opera), a 2017 opera by John Adams
Girls of the Golden West (country music duo), an American country music duo of the 1930s and 1940s

See also
 The Girl of the Golden West (disambiguation)